Dąbrowa  is a settlement in the administrative district of Gmina Zbąszyń, within Nowy Tomyśl County, Greater Poland Voivodeship, in west-central Poland.

References

villages in Nowy Tomyśl County